Kollevågen is a recreational area in Askøy Municipality in Vestland county, Norway. The area includes both "clothed" beaches and naturist beaches. Kollevågen also has an arena where the Lost Weekend music festival is held each August.

References

External links
 Kollevågen - Askøy/Bergen – Scandinavian Naturist Portal
 (in Norwegian) Farlige miljøgifter truer badegjestene [Dangerous pollutants threatening beachgoers] – Article from 2014 in Bergens Tidende

Askøy
Beaches of Norway
Nude beaches